Puerto Rico Highway 149 (PR-149) is a secondary highway in Puerto Rico that connects the towns of Manatí in the north coast of Puerto Rico, from PR-22 to Juana Díaz in the south coast, ending at PR-1. It goes through Ciales, and is a divided highway and a wide rural highway between that municipality and Manatí, as it is also from Juana Díaz to Villalba. From Ciales to Villalba, it is an extremely dangerous mountain road, with very high areas and poor safety barriers. From Ciales to Villalba it passes through the Salto de Doña Juana, a spot with a small waterfall and a small creek where people can jump and swim. It is one of the longest highways going south to north, perhaps the longest excluding PR-1 and PR-52.

The highway also makes intersections with PR-2 just 2 kilometers south from its beginning in PR-22, and an intersection with PR-52 about 8 kilometers north from the terminus at PR-1.

Major intersections

Related route

Puerto Rico Highway 149R (abbreviated Ramal PR-149 or PR-149R) is a business loop road that branches off from PR-149 and leads into downtown Villalba, Puerto Rico. This road used to be signed PR-149, but became 149R when a new road bypassing the downtown area was built around the town center.

See also

 List of highways numbered 149

References

External links

 Guía de Carreteras Principales, Expresos y Autopistas 

149